Sister Maria Michaela of the Blessed Trinity (born Michaela Christine Andörfer:  25 October 1928 - 26 September 2014) was a German Roman Catholic nun ("Ordensschwester") who served for many years as Superior general ("Generaloberin") of the Sisters of Hedwig ("Hedwigschwestern").

Life 
Michaela Christine "Christel" Andörfer, the third of her parents' seven recorded children,  was born at Cottbus and grew up nearby Döbern, a small but long established town a short distance to the north of Germany's frontier with Czechoslovakia.   The little town had carved itself a niche as a centre for the manufacture of "table glass" - cut-to size sheet glass used to protect the surfaces of valuable tables.   The family was a traditional Catholic one.   Michaela's father, who had originally immigrated from Bohemia, worked as table glass grinder, a trade into which his daughter followed him after leaving elementary school.   When she was sixteen the war ended and the family found themselves living in the Soviet occupation zone.   The Polish frontier was suddenly just a couple of hours walk to the east.   The  Andörfers were also involved in agriculture, and during the years of reconstruction and land reform that accompanied Soviet occupation, Christel Andörfer joined in the farming work, "driving a tractor, and able to handle horses, pigs and cows like no one else", according to a later interview with her ninety-six-year-old mother.

As she grew up she was familiar from as far back as her time in Kindergarten with the Sisters of Hedwig ("Hedwigschwestern") who ran a branch in Döbern.  The sisters were a religious order with a particular focus on praising God, and on support for children and adolescents suffering from cognitive, emotional or social impairments.   In the words of a senior member of the order, Christel Andörfer experienced for herself "the selflessness, the willingness to provide hands-on help and the trust in God [on which the sisters prided themselves] during the war years and postwar period".

One day in 1949 she asked her family if they could imagine her becoming nun.   This was interpreted as a statement of intent, masquerading unconvincingly as a tactful question.   On 13 June 1950 she was admitted as a novitiate to the  Hedwig sisters' principal establishment at Berlin-Wannsee.   She then took her religious vows irrevocably in 1957.   During her probationary period she attended a music conservatory, learning both music and Montessori teaching methods.   She became known among the sisters as an organist.   She also learned many of the craft skills which she would be able to apply to teaching mentally impaired children.   Her inputs to the construction of the order's Sancta Maria Remedial Children's Home and of the school attached to it in Berlin-Wannsee were decisive.

In 1969 Sister Michaela was elected (Superior general "Generaloberin") of the Sisters of Hedwig ("Hedwigschwestern").   It was the first change at the top since before the Second World War, and she herself retained the post till 2005.   Her predecessor, Sister Augustina Schmidt, was by this time very old, and died only two years after Sister Michaela's appointment, which got her own time as leader of the order off to a particularly challenging start.

In 1986, at the request of the Berlin senate, she took on the care of a group of HIV-positive babies and infants.   At the time this was considered more noteworthy at the time than subsequently, because of the hysterical insecurities and reactions unleashed by any public discussion of HIV/AIDS.

After relinquishing her position as (Superior general) of the Sisters of Hedwig in 2005, Sister Michaela assumed a new leadership role in 2011 when she took on the role of the Hedwigs' Provincial superior ("Provinzialoberin ") for the Germany Province.

Public recognition 
Sister Maria Michaela was awarded the Order of Merit of the Federal Republic "am Bande" on 9 September 1998.

References 

1928 births
2014 deaths
People from Cottbus
People from the Province of Brandenburg
20th-century German Roman Catholic nuns
21st-century German Roman Catholic nuns
German social workers
Recipients of the Cross of the Order of Merit of the Federal Republic of Germany
Burials at the Waldfriedhof Zehlendorf